Malawimonadidae is a group of unicellular eukaryotes of outsize importance in understanding eukaryote phylogeny.

Phylogeny

Taxonomy
 Phylum Neolouka Cavalier-Smith 2013
 Class Malawimonadea Cavalier-Smith 2003
 Order Malawimonadida Cavalier-Smith 2003
 Family Malawimonadidae O’Kelly & Nerad 1999
 Genus Gefionella Heiss, Ekelund & Simpson 2018
 Species G. okellyi Heiss, Ekelund & Simpson 2018
 Genus Malawimonas O’Kelly & Nerad 1999
 Species M. californiana
 Species M. jakobiformis O’Kelly & Nerad 1999

References

Excavata families